Eric Weinrib (born 21 April 1972) is a filmmaker and TV producer from Plainview, New York, United States.

Career
Weinrib is currently a producer for the Emmy Award-winning documentary series VICE on HBO. His pieces include "Closing Gitmo," "Flint Water Crisis" and "White Collar Weed," which The Denver Post describes as a marijuana story with "a fresh angle" and PopMatters describes as "an age-old cautionary tale of the privatization of a new market." He produced "The Paradise Papers," a VICE News Tonight hour-long special from behind the scenes an undercover, global investigation into a massive data leak containing millions of confidential documents from the international law firm, Appleby, which provides offshore services to the ultra-rich. "The Paradise Papers" won the New York Press Club award for TV Business Reporting.

Weinrib is the producer and director of Roseanne for President!, a documentary about Roseanne Barr's 2012 run for president of the United States. The movie premiered at the 2015 Tribeca Film Festival and won the Founders Prize at the 2015 Traverse City Film Festival. A review in The New York Times stated "Politics meets celebrity in Eric Weinrib’s fascinating documentary 'Roseanne for President!'" and The Daily Beast called it "Intimate and brilliantly observed." The movie was acquired by IFC Films and opened theatrically on July 1, 2016. The movie became available for streaming on the Hulu platform on Inauguration Day 2017. Newsweek selected it as "one of seven movies and shows to watch" online the following weekend.

Weinrib is a long-time collaborator of filmmaker Michael Moore as an archival researcher on Fahrenheit 9/11, coordinating producer on SiCKO and associate producer on Capitalism: A Love Story. 

Weinrib was a staff writer on season one of Comedy Central’s Strangers with Candy starring Stephen Colbert and Amy Sedaris.

Weinrib's short film, Jimmy Walks Away, was an Official Selection of the 1997 Sundance Film Festival. Jimmy Walks Away was included on “Park City; The Sundance Collection,” a DVD compilation of Sundance shorts.

Weinrib’s music credits include producing Michael Moore’s studio rendition of Bob Dylan’s The Times They Are A-Changin', included on the Occupy Wall Street benefit album, Occupy This Album; and presenting a 50th anniversary appearance of Ken Kesey’s “Further” bus and Zane Kesey’s Merry Band of Pranksters at Brooklyn Bowl.

Weinrib ran as an unaffiliated candidate in the 2016 Presidential election.

References

External links
 
 
 Meet the 2015 Tribeca Filmmakers: Eric Weinrib Paints a Revealing Portrait of a Comedic Icon in 'Roseanne for President!'

American filmmakers
1972 births
People from Plainview, New York
Living people